Gondal is an imaginary world or paracosm created by Emily Brontë and Anne Brontë that is found in their juvenilia. Gondal is an island in the North Pacific, just north of the island Gaaldine. It included at least four kingdoms: Gondal, Angora, Exina and Alcona. The earliest surviving reference comes from a diary entry in 1834. None of the prose fiction now survives but poetry still exists, mostly in the form of a manuscript donated to the British Museum in 1933; as do diary entries and scraps of lists. The poems are characterised by war, romance and intrigue. The Gondal setting, along with the similar Angria setting created by the other Brontë siblings, has been described as an early form of speculative fiction.

Invention
The world of Gondal was invented as a joint venture by sisters Emily and Anne. It was a game which they may possibly have played to the end of their lives. Early on they had played with their older siblings Charlotte and Branwell in the imaginary country and game of Angria, which featured the Duke of Wellington and his sons as the heroes.

As in the case of Angria, Gondal has its origins in the Glasstown Confederacy, an earlier imaginary setting created by the siblings as children. Glasstown was founded when twelve wooden soldiers were offered to Branwell Brontë by his father, Patrick Brontë, on 5 June 1826. The soldiers became characters in their imaginary world. Charlotte wrote:

However, it was only during December 1827 that the world really took shape, when Charlotte suggested that everyone own and manage their own island, which they named after heroic leaders: Charlotte had Wellington, Branwell had Sneaky, Emily had Parry, and Anne had Ross. Each island's capital was called Glasstown, hence the name of the Glasstown Confederacy.

Emily and Anne, as the youngest siblings, were often relegated to inferior positions within the game.  Therefore, they staged a rebellion and established the imaginary world of Gondal for themselves.  "The Gondal Chronicles," which would have given us the full story of Gondal, has unfortunately been lost, but the poems and the diary entries they wrote to each other provide something of an outline. The earliest documented reference to Gondal is one of Emily's diary entries in 1834, 9 years after the Glasstown Confederacy, when the two younger sisters were aged 16 and 14 respectively; it read: "The Gondals are discovering the interior of Gaaldine."

All of the prose chronicles are now lost.  The only surviving remnants of the Gondal works are made up of poems, diary entries and some occasional memory aids such as lists of names and characteristics.

World and characters

The Gondal saga is set on two islands in the North and South Pacific. The northern island, Gondal, is a realm of moorlands and snow (based on Yorkshire). The southern island, Gaaldine, features a more tropical climate. Gaaldine is subject to Gondal, which may be related to the period in which the stories were written, the early nineteenth century, when Britain was expanding its empire. It is believed that the stories about them, all now lost, were filled with melodrama and intrigue, and that Anne Brontë used characters that her sister Emily did not. The early part of Gondal's history followed the life of the warlike Julius Brenzaida, a figure reminiscent of the Duke of Zamorna from the siblings' earlier Tales of Angria, and the Prince of Gondal's primary kingdom of Angora. The two loves of Brenzaida's life were Rosina, who became his wife and queen, and Geraldine Sidonia, who gave birth to his daughter, Augusta Geraldin Almeda (A.G.A). Julius was evidently two-faced: after sharing a coronation with Gerald, King of Exina, he had him imprisoned and executed. Julius was eventually assassinated during a civil war and was succeeded by his daughter, A.G.A., who was similar to her father in temperament. She had several lovers, including Alexander of Elbë, Fernando De Samara, and Alfred Sidonia of Aspin Castle, all of whom died. She was eventually murdered during a civil war.

Interpretation
Several of Emily's poems that had been assumed to be allegories for personal experiences were eventually revealed to be episodes in the Gondal saga.

The poems were very personal to Emily: when Charlotte once discovered them, by accident, Emily was furious. Like Byron, Emily saw poetry as more of a process than a product.

 In most cases, Emily destroyed her notes after transcribing the poems into fair-copy manuscript, and where draft versions survive they show only minor differences. The only draft with major differences that survives is of the Gondal poem "Why ask to know the date—the clime".

The first attempt to reconstruct the Gondal material was made by Fanny Ratchford, in a study published by 1945. She has been accused of confusing the issue by assuming that three characters were intended to be the same individual: Rosina, AGA and Geraldine Sidonia. The settings were described in detail by Laura Hinkley in The Brontës (1945), which was used as a source for Philip Henderson's introduction to The Complete Poems of Emily Brontë's (1951), a Folio Society publication. William Doremus Paden, in An Investigation of Gondal (1958), created a detailed chronology of Gondal.

The writings about Angria and Gondal have been seen as early forms of both science fiction and fan fiction. According to Andy Sawyer, Director of the Science Fiction Studies MA at the University of Liverpool, "The Brontës are well known authors with no apparent association with science fiction, but their tiny manuscript books, held at the British Library, are one of the first examples of fan fiction, using favourite characters and settings in the same way as science fiction and fantasy fans now play in the detailed imaginary 'universes' of Star Trek or Harry Potter. While the sense of fantasy is strong, there are teasing examples of what might be called the beginnings of science fiction." Specifically, these works would be "RPF" or real person fiction.

Poems

In February 1844, Emily Brontë copied her poems into two notebooks, one containing Gondal poetry and one containing non-Gondal poetry. The non-Gondal notebook was discovered in 1926 by Mr. Davidson Cook and reproduced in the Shakespeare Head edition of Emily's poems. The notebook of Gondal poems was presented to the British Museum in 1933 by the descendants of Mr. George Smith, of Smith, Elder & Co., Charlotte Brontë's publisher. It was published in full in 1938.

References

Fictional countries
Brontë family
Poetry by Emily Brontë
Poetry by Anne Brontë
Victorian poetry
Fictional islands
Fictional island countries